Next Level is an American dance film written by Byron Kavanagh, directed by Ilyssa Goodman, and produced by Kristi Kaylor and Lisa McGuire.

Plot
Teens compete for best performer at Next Level, a prestigious performing arts summer program.

Cast
 Lauren Orlando as Kelly Hatcher
 Emily Skinner as Cindy Stallings
 Hayden Summerall as Connor Olson
 Chloe East as Lucille "Lucy" Rizzo
 Brooke Elizabeth Butler as Rebecca "Becky" Taylor
 Ellarose Kaylor as Josefina "Josie" Parker
 William Simmons as Travis Perkins
 Chloe Lukasiak as Jasmine Joel
 Jack Vale as Director Bob
 Teddi Mellencamp Arroyave as Mrs. Stallings
 Jamie Grace as Coach

Production
The cast, director, writer, and producers were announced on July 24, 2018. Filming took place in July and August 2018.

Release
The film was released to theatres on September 6, 2019.

Soundtrack
"Girls Rock" performed by Kirsten Collins
"Lips Like Poison" performed by Elyse
”Next Level Theme" performed by Elyse
"Angels in Los Angeles" performed by Bekah
"Never" performed by Sonika Vaid
"Lit" performed by La'Ron Hines
”Pop It” performed by Allison Olsen and Gavin Magnus
”Ignite” performed by Brooke Butler
”Stage Is Mine” performed by Ellarose Kaylor
”Rebel” performed by Lauren Orlando
"Back to Back" performed by Zakry Hayden
"Freeze" performed by Fivel Stewart feat. Booboo Stewart
"Well Played" performed by Elyse
"Girls Talk Too Much" performed by Elyse
"Energy" performed by The Merge
”What We Do” performed by Ellarose Kaylor
”Who I Am” performed by Brooke Butler
"Let Me Know" performed by Elyse
”Live The Dream” performed by Emily Skinner
”Special Place” performed by Lauren Orlando
"Thinking About You" performed by Johnny Orlando
"In The City" performed by Zakry Hayden
”Dance It Off” performed by Reese Herron and Ellarose Kaylor
”Spotlight” performed by Kirsten Collins
"Wando" performed by Andrew Lane
"Beat" performed by Andrew Lane
"Coral Reef" performed by Summer
"Worst Best Friend" performed by The Merge
”Admit It” performed by Hayden Summerall
"Wait All Day" performed by Allison Olsen

References

External links
 

2019 films
American dance films
2010s English-language films
2010s American films